This is a list of Spanish television related events in 1991.

Events 
 4 May: Sergio Dalma represents Spain at the European Song Contest held in Rome (Italy) with the song Bailar pegados, ranking 4th and scoring 119 points 
 19 September: Sitcom Farmacia de guardia debuts in Antena 3. Beginning of the national fiction boom.
 1 October: After 10 years retired, the famous actress and hostess Carmen Sevilla returns to television to present the program Telecupón in Telecinco.

Debuts

Television shows

Ending this year

Foreign series debuts in Spain

Births 
 21 January - Javier Calvo, actor, director y productor.
 24 March, Eduardo Casanova, actor
 3 March, Víctor Elías, actor
 19 July - Andrea del Río, actress.
 3 November - Adriana Torrebejano, actress
 12 December, Jaime Lorente, actor

Deaths 
 21 February - Andrés Mejuto, actor, 82
 14 May - José María Rodero, actor, 68
 14 May - Victoriano Fernández de Asís, journalist, 85
 22 June - Manolo Alcalá, reportero, 57
 4 August - Cassen, actor y humorista, 62
 15 October - Franz Johan, cómico y host, 84
 José Enrique Camacho, actor, 63.

See also
1991 in Spain
List of Spanish films of 1991

References 

1991 in Spanish television